David Keith Woodcock (born 13 October 1966) is an English former footballer who made 27 appearances in the Football League playing as a midfielder for Darlington in the mid-1980s.

Life and career
Woodcock was born in Shardlow, Derbyshire. He began his football career as an apprentice with Sunderland, but left the club without having played for the first-team, and signed for Darlington, newly promoted to the Football League Third Division, in August 1985. Over the next two seasons, he played 27 league matches, around half of which as a substitute, and scored twice. At the end of his second season, Darlington were relegated back to the Fourth Division, and Woodcock left.

He played non-league football for clubs including Newcastle Blue Star, North Shields, Bridlington Town, with whom he won the FA Vase and the Northern Premier League First Division title in 1993, and Bishop Auckland.

His playing career was ended by a badly broken leg in the mid-1990s, and he resumed working in football in 1998 as manager of Darlington Railway Athletic, where he stayed for ten of the next eleven years.

References

1966 births
Living people
People from Shardlow
Footballers from Derbyshire
English footballers
Association football midfielders
Sunderland A.F.C. players
Darlington F.C. players
Newcastle Blue Star F.C. players
North Shields F.C. players
Bridlington Town A.F.C. players
Bishop Auckland F.C. players
English Football League players
Northern Premier League players
English football managers
Darlington Railway Athletic F.C. managers
Northern Football League managers